Camphin-en-Pévèle is a commune in the Nord department in northern France.

Heraldry

See also
Communes of the Nord department

References

Camphinenpevele
French Flanders